Reading Is Fundamental, Inc. (RIF) is the oldest and largest non-profit children's literacy organization in the United States. RIF provides books (print and digital) and reading resources to children nationwide with supporting literacy resources for educators, families, and community volunteers.

History 

In 1966, while reading to children at a school in Washington, D.C., Margaret McNamara, wife of the United States Secretary of Defense Robert S. McNamara, was surprised to learn that many of the students did not have any books of their own. With the help of Lynda Johnson Robb and Arthur White, Margaret McNamara's 1966 experience led to the formation of Reading Is Fundamental (RIF), a nonprofit children's literacy organization dedicated to making reading a fun and beneficial part of everyday life.

After early organizational meetings with other educators in D.C., McNamara secured a $150,000 grant from the Ford Foundation to support pilot activities in the District of Columbia throughout 1967, including the launch of a bookmobile to increase reach outside of classrooms. Following the success RIF had in Washington, the Ford Foundation increased RIF's grant to $285,000 in August 1968, enabling RIF to launch ten model programs across the country. At the time of McNamara's death in 1981, RIF had provided "more than 3 million poor children with 37 million books."

Beginning in the 1970s, RIF began to receive annual federal appropriations which enabled the organization to expand its reach and impact for children in communities nationwide, focusing on at-risk children including those from low-income communities, living in foster care, experiencing homelessness, those with incarcerated parents, and other circumstances demonstrating high need. Authorized in federal legislation, RIF contracted with the U.S. Department of Education to administer the National Inexpensive Book Distribution Program for more than 30 years.

In 2001, Carol Rasco, the former senior adviser to President Bill Clinton and later United States Secretary of Education Richard Riley, became the president and CEO of RIF, succeeding former Bryant University president William E. Trueheart who served in that role from 1997 to 2001. Ruth Graves led the organization from 1975 to 1997. In 2011, Congress eliminated congressionally-directed spending and thus federal funding for RIF. RIF then began transforming its model to secure funding to continue its programmatic work via corporate partners, foundations, and individual donors.

In 2015, RIF released the results of Read for Success, a two-year research study funded by a grant from the Department of Education. Read for Success is centered around motivating children to read by providing access to high-quality classroom book collections, books for students to choose and own, enriching STEAM-themed classroom activities, professional development for teachers and parent engagement. RIF continues to offer the Read for Success program.

In 2016, RIF celebrated its 50th anniversary with a national virtual birthday party hosted from Amidon Elementary School in Washington, D.C. where RIF's first program operated. Rasco departed RIF this same year, succeeded by Alicia Levi as the new and current President and CEO.

Since Levi joined RIF, the organization was gifted Skybrary, an eBook service from Reading Rainbow and LeVar Burton in 2019, held RIF's first National Reading Coalition to focus on the impact of children's literacy on workplace readiness, launched its Race, Equity and Inclusion initiative and continues to focus on ensuring all children have choice and access to books and resources.

As of 2022, RIF has served 100 million children and distributed over 450 million books.

Programs 
RIF's flagship program is Books for Ownership which enables children to choose free book(s) to take home and keep.

RIF's offers Read for Success, a kindergarten – 3rd grade supplemental reading program designed to improve reading proficiency and encourage a passion for reading. The evidence-based program is based on the wide body of research that demonstrates that both reading to children and independent reading are key components of literacy development.

Starting in 2019, Skybrary, RIF's interactive, digital library for educators, children and families offers hundreds of children's books and video field trips to engage young readers and encourage a passion for reading.

In 2017, RIF launched its free book resource website, Literacy Central (www.RIF.org/Literacy-Central), an online destination for teachers, families, and literacy volunteers to get thousands of free digital resources tied directly to the books children love and teachers turn to everyday. The portal provides tools to easily organize and keep reading resources in one place with customizable book lists, printable lesson plans, activities, games, reading passages, calendars, and videos.

RIF offers an online portal, Literacy Network (www.RIF.org/Literacy-Network) to provide tips, tools and resources to the members of the RIF community. Whether community members are looking for program implementation guides, best practices, webinars or other literacy supports to drive impact, they can find it on Literacy Network. RIF also offers it program implements an online Bookstore.

References

External links 
 Reading Is Fundamental website

Educational organizations based in the United States
Non-profit organizations based in Washington, D.C.
Organizations established in 1966
Organizations promoting literacy